Tongowoko Parish is a civil land parish of Tongowoko County, New South Wales. It is bordered by the parishes of Silva, Connulpie, Calathunda, and Caryapundy.

References

Parishes of Tongowoko County
Far West (New South Wales)